Chagatai Khan (Čaɣatay; ; , Čaġatāy; , Chaghatay-Xan; , Chágětái; , Joghatây; 22 December 1183 – 1 July 1242) was the second son of Genghis Khan and Börte. He inherited most of what are now five Central Asian states after the death of his father. He was also appointed by Genghis Khan to oversee the execution of the Yassa, the written code of law created by Genghis Khan.

Under Genghis Khan 
Very little is known about Chagatai's earlier life. He was the second son of Genghis Khan and Börte. Chagatai was considered hot-headed and somewhat temperamental by his relatives, because of his attitude of non-acceptance of Jochi as a full-brother. He was the most vocal about this issue among his relations. He was assigned 4 mingghans (led by Qarachar of Barlas, Kököchü of Baarin, Müge of Jalairs and Idiqudai Noyan) and an appanage around Altai Mountains in 1206 by his father.

He joined the invasion of Jin Empire in 1211 with Jochi and Ögedei, capturing several cities and invading Shaanxi and Henan in 1213, also plundering Yanggu. Later Chagatai appeared at campaign against Khwarazmian Empire with his father and brothers, capturing Otrar in 1218, Samarkand in 1220, Urgench in March-April 1221. The Urgench campaign was noticeably harder because Chagatai and Jochi failed to co-operate. After this incident Ögedei was appointed commander of the besieging forces and Chagatai was given task of maintaining communication between Mongol forces with building bridges and restoring roads. He returned to his father's side during his siege of Talaqan. Chagatai was greatly affected when his son Mutukan was killed during the siege of Bamiyan in 1221.

He was present at the battle where Jalal ad-Din Mingburnu was defeated near the Indus River. He later commanded the rear guard during conquest of Western Xia.

During reign of Ögedei and Töregene 
Chagatai succeeded Genghis Khan in his domains in what came to be known as Chagatai Khanate in 1227 with its capital in Almaliq city, in the valley of the Upper Ili, near the site of the present Kulja, and consequently in the extreme east of his dominion. According to Edward Ross, "his reason for fixing it in that remote position, instead of at Bukhara or Samarkand, was probably one of necessity. His Mongol tribesmen and followers—the mainstay of his power—were passionately fond of the life of the steppes." As the eldest surviving son and head of the house, he was present at the enthronement ceremony of Ögedei on 13 September 1229 and supported his reign. Ögedei in his turn sent Güyük as Chagatai's ward. Although Rashidaddin claimed that Chagatai died shortly before Ögedei, Juvayni told of further activities of Chagatai, such as strong support to regency of Töregene. However, he soon died.

Administration
His known viziers include Vajir, Baha al-Din Marghinani and Habash Amid. Vajir was described as Turkish, Uyghur and Khitan by different authors. He was employed by Qushuq Noyan from Jalayir tribe to court of Chagatai. Having written a book about history of Mongol Empire, he was regarded highly by Chagatai. He even let him to execute one of his daughters-in-law in charges of adultery. After Chagatai's death, Vajir was executed for treason alongside Chagatai's physician Majd al-Din, since his widow Yesülün charged them with poisoning of Chagatai. Habash Amid was a Muslim Khwarazmian from Otrar and a secretary originally. He was assigned to Chagatai in 1218 and survived the purge thanks to his support for Qara Hülegü. Baha al-Din Marghinani also survived Chagatai, being a friend of his son Yesü Möngke although he was purged later.

Family
Chagatai had two principal wives along other wives and concubines:
 Yesülün Khatun — daughter of Qata Noyan of Khongirads (cousin of Börte)
 Mutukan — killed during siege of Bamyan in 1221
 Baiju
 Büri (d. 1252) — a commander in Mongol invasion of Europe
 Yesünto'a
 Qara Hülegü (b. before 1221) — khan (1242-1246; 1252)
 Belgeshi (c.1209 - c.1222) — died shortly after Mutukan
 Yesü Möngke — khan (1246–1252)
 Tögen Khatun — sister of Yesülün Khatun
 Sevinch Khatun — daughter of Buraq Hajib
 Ebuskun — only attested in Mirza Muhammad Haidar Dughlat's Tarikh-i-Rashidi, probably same as Yesülün
 Children by concubines
 Mochi Yebe — eldest son, wasn't given high regard by Chagatai, son-in-law of Batu Khan, controlled territory on the left bank of the Dnieper
 Tekuder — Ilkhanate commander in Georgia
 Ahmad — a commander under Baraq
 Tekshi — he had a son called Tabudughar and grandson: Toghan, Hoqolqu, Qoriqtai and Qutluq-Temür.
 Nom-Quli
 Bük-Buqa
 Temüder
 Qotan
 Cheche
 Chichektü — had sons: Shadban and Qushman
 Ishal — had sons: Qan Buqa and Uladai
 Toghan — had sons: Qoriqtai, Bük-Buqa, Nom-Quli
 Sarban
 Qushiqi — Commander in Mongol conquest of Song China
 Negübei — khan (1271-1272)
 Baidar — A commander in Mongol invasion of Europe
 Alghu — khan (1260-1265)
 Baiju
 Mochi (c.1279) — commander of Qara'unas
 Abdullah (c.1279-1298) — commander of Qara'unas

Legacy 
According to Rashidaddin, he was a just and competent ruler. Minhaj-i-Siraj Juzjani also considered him to be dignified and open hearted. Muslims viewed Chagatai Khan with negativity and hostility because Chagatai Khan strictly enforced Mongol Yasa law against Islamic Shariah law banning Halal animal slaughter and Islamic prayer ritual ablution as well as the Islamic legal system. The Chagatai language takes its name from him, as well as people surnamed Chughtai, city of Joghatai in Iran and Ciğatay village in Azerbaijan.

Ancestry

References

Sources 
 
 
 

1183 births
1242 deaths
Chagatai khans
13th-century monarchs in Asia
Founding monarchs
Sons of emperors
Tengrist monarchs